April Stevens (born Caroline Vincinette LoTempio; April 29, 1929) is an American singer best known for her collaborations with her younger brother, Nino Tempo.

Biography
Stevens has recorded since she was twenty two years old. Her most popular solo recording was her RCA Victor recording of "I'm in Love Again" (music and lyrics by Cole Porter). Accompanied by an orchestra arranged and conducted by Henri René, Stevens' recording peaked at No. 6 on the pop chart in 1951.
Her follow-up, "Gimme Me a Little Kiss, Will Ya, Huh?" made it to No. 10 later that year, and her next release, "And So to Sleep Again", hit #27.

Stevens returned to the U.S. chart in 1959 with the song "Teach Me Tiger", which caused a minor uproar for its sexual suggestiveness and consequently did not receive airplay on many radio stations. The song peaked at No. 86 on the Billboard Hot 100. The tune was featured in the 2006 film Blind Dating, the 2011 Flemish drama film North Sea Texas, season 5, episode 7 of Call the Midwife, and recurs throughout season 1 of the Russian thriller series To the Lake.

Stevens is best known for her 1963 Atco Records recording of "Deep Purple" (music by Peter DeRose and lyrics by Mitchell Parish) with her brother Antonino LoTempio (singing under the stage name Nino Tempo). A standard song that Larry Clinton and His Orchestra and band vocalist Bea Wain had popularized in 1939, the Stevens and Tempo version reached No.1 on the Hot 100 on November 16, 1963, and No.17 in the British charts. The song won the 1963 Grammy Award for Best Rock and Roll Recording. It sold over one million copies and was awarded a Gold disc.

The duo also enjoyed a 1964 follow-up hit in the U.S. with the standard song "Whispering" (music by Vincent Rose and lyrics by Richard Coburn (pseudonym of Frank Reginald DeLong; 1886–1952) and John Schonberger). The recording, which had an arrangement similar to their recording of "Deep Purple", reached No. 11 on the Hot 100 singles chart. They also had chart success with "All Strung Out", which reached No. 26 on the American Hot 100 in 1966. Later that year, the single "The Coldest Night of the Year" was released on Atlantic 584048 in the UK. A solo single by Stevens was issued in December 1967, a double-sided single of "Wanting You" with "Falling in Love Again" on MGM 1366 in the UK and MGM K 13825 in the US. "Wanting You" became a Northern soul classic.

In the Netherlands, the duo enjoyed a No. 5 hit in early 1973 with their version of "(Where Do I Begin?) Love Story".

In her 2013 autobiography, Teach Me Tiger, Stevens said she was born in 1929. She admitted to taking years off her age, and her brother, Nino, going along with it. This was supposedly due to their competition with acts in their late teens and early twenties that were dominating the record charts in the 1960s.

Awards
 1963 — Nino Tempo & April Stevens' rendition of "Deep Purple" received a Grammy Award for Best Rock & Roll Recording.

Discography

Albums
 Teach Me Tiger (Imperial, 1960)
 Alone (Mr. Sam, 1985)
 A Very Special Time (Asia Record, 1989)
 Carousel Dreams (USA Music Group, 1990)

Singles

References

External links
 
 
 
 

1929 births
Living people
American women pop singers
American pop rock singers
Traditional pop music singers
American women rock singers
Imperial Records artists
King Records artists
RCA Victor artists
Musicians from Niagara Falls, New York
American people of Italian descent
Grammy Award winners
21st-century American women